Kurash for the 2013 Asian Indoor and Martial Arts Games was held at the Ansan Sangnoksu Gymnasium. It took place from 4 to 6 July 2013. In the past, this sport was a demonstration one for Macau 2007. Like the sport of indoor kabaddi, Kurash was contested in both Hanoi (Asian Indoor Games) and Bangkok (Asian Martial Arts Games) separately in 2009 for medals.

Medalists

Men

Women

Medal table

Results

Men

66 kg
4 July

73 kg
4 July

81 kg
5 July

90 kg
5 July

+90 kg
6 July

Women

52 kg
4 July

57 kg
5 July

63 kg
6 July

References

External links
 

2013 Asian Indoor and Martial Arts Games events
2013